Eperjesi is a Hungarian-language surname. It is a toponymic surname literally meaning "one from Eperjes (Prešov)". Notable people with this surname include:
Gábor Eperjesi, Hungarian footballer
 (? - 1793), Transylvanian bishop and educator

References

Hungarian-language surnames
Toponymic surnames